The 2002 Sandown 500 was an Australian motor race for Production Cars which drew its entries from those competing in the Australian Nations Cup Championship and Australian GT Production Car Championship. It was the second Sandown 500 since the former touring car endurance race was revived for production cars and would be the last as Sandown would regain the rights to the 500 kilometre V8 Supercar race the following year.

The race, which was the 35th Sandown 500 endurance race was held at Sandown Raceway in Melbourne, Victoria, Australia over the weekend of 8 September 2002. It was won by  Paul Stokell and Anthony Tratt driving a Lamborghini Diablo GTR.

Classes
Cars competed in four classes:
 Nations Cup Group 1
 Nations Cup Group 2
 GT Production Class A
 GT Production Class B

Sandown 500 Top Gun Challenge

After qualifying was completed the fastest ten cars competed in a one-lap runoff for the top ten grid positions. Runoff results as follows:

Official results
Cars failing to complete 75% of winner's distance marked as Not Classified (NC). Race results as follows:

Statistics
 Provisional Pole Position - #5 Jim Richards - 1:21.4133
 Pole Position - #17 Sam Newman - 1:18.5170
 Fastest Lap - #5 Jim Richards - 1:13.8765
 Race Average Speed - 139 km/h

References

External links
 2002 Sandown 500, www.procar.com.au via web.archive.org

Sandown 500
Motorsport at Sandown
September 2002 sports events in Australia